Panorama is the third studio album by American rock band the Cars, released on August 15, 1980, by Elektra Records. Like its predecessors, it was produced by Roy Thomas Baker and released on Elektra Records.

Background
The record marked a change from the upbeat pop rock and hard rock of the group's previous albums, representing a more aggressive and experimental sound. Billboard said that while Panorama retained The Cars' minimalist approach from their debut album, it sounded sufficiently different to avoid having the group sound like a caricature of itself.

Panorama peaked at number five on the Billboard 200 and has been certified platinum by the Recording Industry Association of America (RIAA). The album's lead single, "Touch and Go", reached number 37 on the Billboard Hot 100.

Track listing

Personnel
Credits adapted from the liner notes of Panorama.

The Cars
 David Robinson – drums, backing vocals
 Greg Hawkes – keyboards, saxophones, backing vocals
 Benjamin Orr – vocals, bass guitar
 Ric Ocasek – vocals, rhythm guitar
 Elliot Easton – lead guitar, backing vocals

Technical
 Roy Thomas Baker – production
 Ian Taylor – engineering
 John Weaver – engineering assistance
 Jason Corsaro – engineering assistance
 Thom Moore – production assistance

Artwork
 David Robinson – cover design
 Paul McAlpine – photography

Charts

Weekly charts

Year-end charts

Certifications

References

1980 albums
Albums produced by Roy Thomas Baker
The Cars albums
Elektra Records albums